Qalandari (also Romanized as Qalandarī) is a village in Asiab Rural District, in the Central District of Omidiyeh County, Khuzestan Province, Iran. At the 2006 census, its population was 167, in 31 families.

55.909, 3.557

References 

Populated places in Omidiyeh County